Deuteraphorura bizkaiensis is a species of  springtail belonging to the family Onychiuridae. Its type locality is the Otxas cave in Igorre, Basque Country, Spain.

References

Collembola
Fauna of Spain
Animals described in 2021
Cave arthropods